Piazzale Donatello is a city square in Florence, Italy. The square is lined by purpose-built artists studio's constructed during the nineteenth century. Each boasts expansive north facing windows. These studios saw the likes of many notable painters, among them Gianni Vagnetti and Michele Gordigiani. The studios remain active to this day with painters working from life by natural light.

Buildings around the square
Porta a Pinti
Convento di San Giusto alle mura
English Cemetery, Florence
Casa famiglia Santa Lucia
Palazzo della Gherardesca
Giardino della Gherardesca
Villa Donatello

Gallery

Donatello